Carnes is a surname. Notable people with the surname include:

 Clarence Carnes
 Cody Carnes, American Christian musician
 Edward Earl Carnes
 Jill Carnes
 Jimmy Carnes, noted college and Olympic track coach
 Kim Carnes
 Michael Carnes
 Patrick Carnes
 Ryan Carnes
 Thomas P. Carnes

See also
 Carnes, Iowa
 Carnes, Mississippi
 Carne